Elena Vesnina was the defending champion, but she retired in the second round against Estrella Cabeza Candela.
Garbiñe Muguruza won her first WTA singles title, defeating Klára Zakopalová in the final, 6–4, 6–0.

Seeds

Main draw

Finals

Top half

Bottom half

Qualifying

Seeds

Qualifiers

Lucky losers
  Silvia Soler Espinosa
  An-Sophie Mestach

Draw

First qualifier

Second qualifier

Third qualifier

Fourth qualifier

References
 Main Draw
 Qualifying Draw

2014 Hobart International
Hobart International – Singles